Tim Harrysson (born February 10, 1992) is a Swedish professional ice hockey goaltender currently playing with Kumla HC of the Hockeyettan (Div.1) He previously played with Linköpings HC in the Elitserien during the 2010–11 Elitserien season.

References

External links

1992 births
Linköping HC players
Living people
Mora IK players
Swedish ice hockey goaltenders
HC Vita Hästen players
Sportspeople from Örebro